Calcasieu may refer to:

Calcasieu, Louisiana, an unincorporated community 
Calcasieu Parish, Louisiana, a civil parish
Calcasieu Lake
Calcasieu River